Avoca is a northern suburb of Durban, KwaZulu-Natal, South Africa. It is administered by the eThekwini Metropolitan Municipality and its postal code is 4001.

References

 

Suburbs of Durban